Mustabad is a village and mandal headquarters of Mustabad mandal, located in Rajanna Sircilla district of Telangana, India

Geography

References 

Villages in Rajanna Sircilla district